Abdessalem Ayouni "Slouma" (born 16 May 1994) is a Tunisian middle-distance runner. He represented his country in the 800 metres at the 2017 World Championships. With the personal bests of 1.44.99 he is the national record holder in the 800 metres.

International competitions

Personal bests

Outdoor
800 metres – 1:44.99 (JO Tokyo 2021)
1000 metres – 2:33.9 (Tunis 2010)
1500 metres –  3:37.30 (Dessau 2019)
Indoor
800 metres – 1:48.22 (Liévin 2019)

References

1994 births
Living people
Tunisian male middle-distance runners
World Athletics Championships athletes for Tunisia
Athletes (track and field) at the 2015 African Games
Athletes (track and field) at the 2018 Mediterranean Games
Athletes (track and field) at the 2022 Mediterranean Games
Mediterranean Games silver medalists for Tunisia
Mediterranean Games medalists in athletics
Athletes (track and field) at the 2019 African Games
African Games medalists in athletics (track and field)
African Games gold medalists for Tunisia
African Games gold medalists in athletics (track and field)
Athletes (track and field) at the 2020 Summer Olympics
Olympic athletes of Tunisia
21st-century Tunisian people